Delph (Old English (ge)delf a quarry) is a village in the civil parish of Saddleworth in the Metropolitan Borough of Oldham, in Greater Manchester, England.

The centre of the village has barely changed from the 19th century when a number of small textile mills provided employment for the local community. There is a significant first century AD Roman fort at Castleshaw.

The village is home to one of the Saddleworth Whit Friday brass band contests, with in the region of seventy-five bands from across the UK and beyond marching down the main street at five-minute intervals on the evening of the contest which often continues into the early hours. In the village of Dobcross a Henry Livings memorial prize is open to bands who play on any of the morning's walks on Whit Friday.
It is also home to the Millgate Arts Centre, the home of the Saddleworth Players. This group puts on six plays a year, as well as hosting a number of other events throughout the year.

The main street running through the centre of Delph was used in some of the external shots of the 2001 feature film The Parole Officer, starring Steve Coogan, Om Puri and Jenny Agutter.
Delph was also used in the filming of the Whit Friday scene in the 1996 film Brassed Off.
Delph is mentioned in the song "This One's For Now" by the band Half Man Half Biscuit on their 2014 album Urge for Offal. The legendary landmark above Delph 'St Thomas Church at The Heights' was featured in the blockbuster movie "A Monster Calls" starring Liam Neeson.

Delph railway station was opened in 1851 as part of the London and North Western Railway route from Oldham to Delph. The station closed in May 1955, when the Delph Donkey passenger train service to Delph via Greenfield was withdrawn.

The A62 road runs just south of the village and was previously the main thoroughfare from Manchester and Oldham into Huddersfield and Leeds, although now sees comparatively lower traffic levels upon the opening of the M62 around 5 miles north of Delph. Local buses run to Oldham and Ashton-Under-Lyne.

Notable people
 

Albert Mallalieu (1904–1991), English cricketer

See also

Listed buildings in Saddleworth

References

External links
 www.delph.org.uk

Villages in Greater Manchester
Towns and villages of the Peak District
Geography of the Metropolitan Borough of Oldham
Saddleworth